The Duff reaction or hexamine aromatic formylation is a formylation reaction used in organic chemistry for the synthesis of benzaldehydes with hexamine as the formyl carbon source. It is named after James Cooper Duff, who was a chemist at the College of Technology, Birmingham, around 1920–1950.

The electrophilic species in this electrophilic aromatic substitution reaction is the iminium ion CH2+NR2. The initial reaction product is an iminium which is hydrolyzed to the aldehyde. See mechanism below. The reaction requires strongly electron donating substituents on the aromatic ring such as in a phenol. Formylation occurs ortho to the electron donating substituent preferentially, unless the ortho positions are blocked, in which case the formylation occurs at the para position.

Examples are the synthesis of 3,5-di-tert-butylsalicylaldehyde:

and the synthesis of syringaldehyde:

If both ortho positions are vacant then a diformylation is possible, as in the formation of diformylcresol from p-cresol.

Reaction mechanism 
The reaction mechanism displayed below  demonstrates step by step how hexamine donates a methine group to an aromatic substrate via a series of equilibria reactions, with iminium ion intermediates. Initially, addition to the aromatic ring results in an intermediate at the oxidation state of a benzylamine. An intramolecular redox reaction then ensues, raising the benzylic carbon to the oxidation state of an aldehyde. The oxygen atom is provided by water on acid hydrolysis in the final step.

See also 
 Bouveault aldehyde synthesis
 Bodroux-Chichibabin aldehyde synthesis
 Reimer-Tiemann reaction
 Sommelet reaction
 Vilsmeier-Haack reaction

References 

Addition reactions
Name reactions
Formylation reactions